Ederson Trindade Lopes or simply Eder (born December 31, 1984) is a Brazilian football player.

References

External links

Thespakusatsu Gunma Transfer

1984 births
Living people
Brazilian footballers
Brazilian expatriate footballers
Expatriate footballers in Japan
J2 League players
Thespakusatsu Gunma players
Association football forwards
Footballers from São Paulo